St. Francis DeSales Church is a historic Roman Catholic church on Church Street in Lexington, Greene County, New York.  It was completed in 1895 and is a one-story, four by one bay light frame structure on a stone and concrete foundation.  It features a steeply pitched gable roof, narrow clapboard sheathing, and an  enclosed porch.

It was added to the National Register of Historic Places in 1999.

References

Roman Catholic churches in New York (state)
Churches on the National Register of Historic Places in New York (state)
Carpenter Gothic church buildings in New York (state)
Roman Catholic churches completed in 1895
19th-century Roman Catholic church buildings in the United States
Churches in Greene County, New York
National Register of Historic Places in Greene County, New York
1895 establishments in New York (state)